Bemelen is a village in the Dutch province of Limburg. It is part of the municipality of Eijsden-Margraten, and lies about 5 km east of Maastricht.

The village was first mentioned in 1096 as Bemele. The etymology is unknown. Bemelen is a village on the eastern flank of the Maas  along the Roman road from Maastricht to Aachen.

The Catholic St Laurentius Church is a single aisled church. The tower has 12th century elements. The church was replaced in 1845 by a neoclassical building.

Bemelen was home to 138 people in 1840. Until 1982, Bemelen was a separate municipality, after which it became part of the municipality Margraten, which fused with municipality Eijsden in 2011 to form Eijsden-Margraten.

Gallery

References

Former municipalities of Limburg (Netherlands)
Populated places in Limburg (Netherlands)
Eijsden-Margraten